Kenneth (Andy) Andrews is professor of sociology at the University of North Carolina at Chapel Hill. He received his doctorate in sociology from the State University of New York at Stony Brook in 1997. In 1993, Andrews earned his Master's degree in sociology from the same institution. His bachelor's degree is from Millsaps College. Prior to his position at the University of North Carolina, Andrews was a member of the department of sociology at Harvard University and served as a visiting scholar for the Russell Sage Foundation in New York City.

Andrews's research concerns the outcomes of social movements, especially the U.S. Civil Rights Movement. His book Freedom is a Constant Struggle: The Mississippi Civil Rights Movement and Its Legacy (2004) won the 2005 Distinguished Book Award of the American Sociological Association's Collective Behavior and Social Movements section.

External links
Kenneth Andrew's website
UNC Sociology Department
American Sociological Association

American sociologists
Millsaps College alumni
Stony Brook University alumni
Harvard University faculty
University of North Carolina at Chapel Hill faculty
Living people
Year of birth missing (living people)